Ben Wheeler may refer to:

 Ben Wheeler, Texas, an unincorporated community in Van Zandt County, Texas, United States
 Ben Wheeler (cricketer) (born 1991), New Zealand cricketer
 Ben Wheeler (Canadian doctor), Canadian doctor in the British Army
 Benjamin Ide Wheeler (1854–1927), Greek and comparative philology professor at Cornell University
 Benjamin Wheeler (2006-2012), victim in the Sandy Hook Elementary School shooting

Wheeler, Ben